Tangerine is a cross-platform music server for Linux, macOS, and Windows. Tangerine uses the Digital Audio Access Protocol (DAAP) protocol to allow the user to listen to music over a network using a client such as Rhythmbox, Banshee, or iTunes. Tangerine uses SQLite as its database.

External links
 Tangerine official web page

Media players
Audio streaming software for Linux
Audio software that uses GTK
GNOME Applications
Free software programmed in C
Free software programmed in C Sharp